The Santa Clause is a 1994 American Christmas fantasy comedy film written by Leo Benvenuti and Steve Rudnick, and directed by John Pasquin. The first installment in The Santa Clause franchise, it stars Tim Allen as Scott Calvin, an ordinary man who accidentally causes Santa Claus (played by Tim Allen's actual stunt double, Steve Lucescu) to fall from his roof on Christmas Eve. When he and his young son, Charlie, finish St. Nick's trip and deliveries, they go to the North Pole where Scott learns that he must become the new Santa and convince those he loves that he is indeed Santa Claus.

The film was released on November 11, 1994, and grossed $190 million. It received positive reviews from critics and it has since become a Christmas-time staple among viewers. Its success led to two sequels, The Santa Clause 2 (2002) and The Santa Clause 3: The Escape Clause (2006), which were both financially successful despite the former's mixed and the latter's negative reception. The franchise continues with a follow-up series, The Santa Clauses, which premiered November 16, 2022 on Disney+.

Plot 

Scott Calvin is a marketing director for a toy company in Lakeside, Illinois. A divorced father, he prepares to spend Christmas Eve with his son Charlie. Scott wants Charlie to maintain his belief in Santa Claus, despite not believing himself. Scott's ex-wife Laura and her psychiatrist husband Dr. Neil Miller both stopped believing in Santa at a young age, and they feel it is time for Charlie to do the same.

Following an uneventful evening at Denny's, Scott and Charlie are awakened that night by a noise on the roof. In his investigation, Scott startles a man wearing a Santa suit standing on the roof, who slips and falls to his death. The man's body vanishes, leaving behind a red suit and business card stating that if anything were to happen to the man, the responsible party should don his suit and resume his mission. Scott and Charlie are surprised to find a sleigh and reindeer perched on the roof. At Charlie's request, Scott reluctantly dons the suit and spends the rest of the night delivering gifts before the reindeer take them to the North Pole. The head elf, Bernard, explains that by putting on the suit, Scott is subject to a legal technicality known as "The Santa Clause", and has accepted all of Santa's duties and responsibilities. Bernard gives Scott eleven months to get his affairs in order before reporting back to the North Pole on Thanksgiving. Confused and overwhelmed, Scott changes into the pajamas provided to him and falls asleep.

The next morning, Scott awakes in his own bed and believes the previous night's events were a dream, but realizes he is still wearing the pajamas given to him. Charlie, recalling what had happened, is convinced that his father is the new Santa Claus, and his proud expression of this arouses disbelief and concern in Laura, Neil, and the school staff. Scott, not wanting to destroy Charlie's newfound enthusiasm, asks him to keep their North Pole trip a secret. Over the next year, Scott undergoes a drastic and inexplicable transformation; he gains an extraordinary amount of weight and develops an increased fondness for sweets, particularly milk and cookies. He develops a thick white beard that instantly regrows after shaving, and his hair turns white in spite of attempts to dye it. During a meeting with his company, Scott is angered at a proposal to advertise a toy military tank by showing Santa riding it. He also begins to recount 'naughty' and 'nice' children by name when he sees them. After Laura and Neil witness children wanting to sit on Scott's lap at Charlie's soccer game, they assume Scott is deliberately misleading Charlie and decide to have a judge suspend Scott's visitation rights. On Thanksgiving night, a devastated Scott goes to Laura and Neil's house to see Charlie one last time. Charlie, desperate to help Scott realize how important he is to the children of the world, shows Scott a magical snow globe that Bernard had given him, finally convincing Scott that he really is Santa. When Laura and Neil allow Scott a minute to talk to Charlie alone, Bernard appears and transports him and Charlie to the North Pole. Thinking Scott has kidnapped Charlie, Laura and Neil call the police. 

Scott sets out to deliver gifts with Charlie in tow. Upon arriving at Laura and Neil's home, Scott is arrested inside the house while Charlie waits for him in the sleigh. The elves send a team to break him out of jail. Scott returns Charlie to his house and insists he spend Christmas Eve with Laura and Neil. His heartfelt speech to Charlie about the importance of everyone in the family convinces Laura and Neil that he is Santa. Laura burns the court documents suspending Scott's visitation rights, and tells Scott he can visit anytime. Bernard appears and tells Charlie that any time he shakes his magical snow globe, his father will appear. Before leaving, Scott gives Laura and Neil the two Christmas presents that they never got as children, which had caused their disbelief in Santa. Scott's takeoff from the roof proves his identity to the police and a crowd of witnesses outside the house.

Shortly after Scott leaves, Charlie summons him back with the snow globe and Laura agrees to let Charlie go with Scott in the sleigh to finish delivering the presents.

Cast

Production 
The script was written on spec by Steve Rudnick and Leo Benvenuti. In November 1992, it was announced Hollywood Pictures had acquired the script as a potential starring vehicle for Tim Allen.

The film was shot at Raleigh Studios in Hollywood, California, and on location in the Greater Toronto Area, with Oakville serving as the city of Lakeside, Illinois. The reindeer used in the film were all from the Toronto Zoo. The trains used in the North Pole scene and the start of the film were all made by LGB.

Bill Murray and Chevy Chase were offered the role of Scott Calvin, but both turned it down; Chase declined due to scheduling conflicts, and Murray did not want to do another holiday-themed movie after doing Scrooged. Tom Selleck, Robin Williams, Tom Hanks, and Mel Gibson were also considered for the role. Jeff Daniels, Stanley Tucci and Bradley Whitford were considered for the role of Neil Miller. Patricia Richardson, Patricia Clarkson, Patricia Heaton, and Kate Burton were considered for the role of Laura Miller.

Reception

Box office 
The Santa Clause grossed $145.3 million in the United States and Canada, and $45 million in other territories, for a worldwide, total of $190.3 million.

The film grossed $19.3 million in its opening weekend, finishing second at the US box office behind Interview with the Vampire which opened with $36 million. In its second weekend it grossed $17.1 million, finishing third. Over the three-day Thanksgiving frame it then made $20.4 million. In November 2020, with the COVID-19 pandemic limiting new releases, The Santa Clause was re-released into 1,581 theaters and grossed $711,000.

Freeform and AMC have played the film on television during the holiday season with record ratings.

Critical response 
On Rotten Tomatoes, the film holds an approval rating of 73% based on 59 reviews, with an average rating of 5.9/10. The website's critics consensus reads:  "The Santa Clause is utterly undemanding, but it's firmly rooted in the sort of good old-fashioned holiday spirit missing from too many modern yuletide films." 
On Metacritic the film has a weighted average score of 57 out of 100, based on reviews from 13 critics, indicating "mixed or average reviews". Audiences surveyed by CinemaScore gave the film an average grade "A−" on scale of A+ to F.

Sandi Davis of The Oklahoman ended up placing the film sixth overall on her list of the best films of 1994.

Home media 
At one point in the film, a brief exchange between Scott and Laura takes place in which Laura hands Scott a piece of paper with Neal's mother's phone number on it. Scott then says "1-800-SPANK-ME. I know that number." The line is also removed from the Disney+ print. On television broadcasts, the number is changed to 1-800-POUND.

The Santa Clause was released on DVD on October 29, 2002, and was presented in widescreen and fullscreen versions.

See also
 List of Christmas films
 Santa Claus in film

References

External links 

 
 
 

1994 films
1994 comedy films
1994 directorial debut films
1990s children's comedy films
1990s children's fantasy films
1990s Christmas comedy films
1990s fantasy comedy films
American children's comedy films
American children's fantasy films
American Christmas films
American Christmas comedy films
American fantasy comedy films
American slapstick comedy films
1990s English-language films
Films directed by John Pasquin
Puppet films
Films adapted into television shows
Films scored by Michael Convertino
Films set in Chicago
Films shot in Toronto
Santa Claus in film
Hollywood Pictures films
Walt Disney Pictures films
Films about father–son relationships
1990s American films
The Santa Clause (franchise)